The Guatemala national beach soccer team represents Guatemala in international beach soccer competitions and is controlled by FENAFUTG, the governing body for football in Guatemala.

Current squad
Correct as of November 2010

Coach: Raul Aldana

Achievements
CONCACAF Beach Soccer Championship Best: Third Place
2021

External links
Squad

North American national beach soccer teams
Beach Soccer